Mike MacRae (born July 29, 1977) is an American actor, stand-up comedian, producer, director and writer.

Early life and career
A native of St. Louis, Missouri, MacRae moved to Houston, Texas, in 1995 where he graduated from Rice University in 1999 and started performing in The Laff Stop. He appeared on television for the first time in 2001 with Comedy Central's Premium Blend and is a regular on The Bob & Tom Show. In 2007, he released his first comedy album Hovercraft.

As an actor, he has appeared in feature films and television series including Balls Out, Bird-Scorpion, I Love You, Will Smith, Keith & Heath, Punching the Clown, Rooster Teeth Shorts, Taste in Powder, The Man Who Never Cried and 2009: Lost Memories. He has done voice work for ADV Films and dubbed characters in many English language versions of anime. In addition, he has also voiced the Disney/Pixar character Buzz Lightyear in Toy Story video games.

MacRae made his first appearance on the Late Show with David Letterman on May 2, 2007. He was a cast member on Frank TV, and in 2009 was part of the Just for Laughs festival in Montreal, Quebec. MacRae also contributes voice impersonations to The Jimmy Dore Show on KPFK in Los Angeles. In the fall of 2012, he began appearing on The Howard Stern Show on Sirius XM, doing his impersonation of Republican presidential candidate Mitt Romney.

Filmography

Film
Balls Out - Doctor
Bird-Scorpion - Cop
I Love You, Will Smith - Randal
Keith & Heath - Unseen Narrator (voice)
Punching the Clown - Car Heckler
Taste in Powder - Cochise
The Man Who Never Cried - Narrator (voice)
Washingtonia - Unknown role (voice)
2009: Lost Memories - JBI 2nd-in-Command (voice)

Television
Colorful - Anchorman
Frank TV - Various
Late Show with David Letterman - Himself/Guest
Let's Be Real - Charlie Rose (voice)
Premium Blend - Himself/Guest
Sketchy - Unknown role
Knight Rider / Trust Doesn't Rust S1E9 - Tony

Anime
Appleseed Ex Machina - Manuel Aeacus
Cromartie High School - Pootan
Diamond Daydreams - Takeda
Excel Saga - That Man
Full Metal Panic! - Gauron
Kaleido Star: New Wings - Leon Oswald
Magical Shopping Arcade Abenobashi - Taro Hayashi, Taro Imamiya
Martian Successor Nadesico: The Prince of Darkness - Hokushin
Mezzo - Omabari
Neo Ranga - Haseoka
Pani Poni Dash! - Alien Captain (Ep. 1-14)
Papuwa - Harlem
Peacemaker Kurogane - Toshizo Hijikata
Saint Seiya - Phoenix Ikki, Black Phoenix
Saiyuki - Dokugakuji (Episode 21-50, after Jason Miesse)
Samurai Gun - Rekkai
Steel Angel Kurumi - Dr. Ayanokouji
Super GALS! - Gunjo
The Super Milk-chan Show - The President
Yumeria - Kurofuku

Animation
Mike Tyson Mysteries - Charlie Rose
Our Cartoon President - Mitt Romney, Joe Manchin
Viva Piñata - Prewitt Profitamole

Video games
Disney Infinity - Buzz Lightyear
Disney Infinity 2.0 - Buzz Lightyear
Disney Infinity 3.0 - Buzz Lightyear
Kinect Disneyland Adventures - Buzz Lightyear
Kinect Rush: A Disney–Pixar Adventure - Buzz Lightyear
Toy Story 3: The Video Game - Buzz Lightyear
Kingdom Hearts III - Buzz Lightyear
Where the Water Tastes Like Wine - August
Wizard101 - Old One/Dasein

Web
Rooster Teeth Shorts - Mr. Sprinklestein

Radio
The Bob & Tom Show - Himself/Guest
The Howard Stern Show - Himself

Crew work
Mitt Romney's Brain Gets Hacked - Director, producer, writer
Taste in Powder -  Director, producer, writer
The Jimmy Dore Show (YouTube series) - Writer

Impressions on Frank TV
Bill O'Reilly
Dan Aykroyd
Dirk Nowitzki
Edward Asner (as Lou Grant from The Mary Tyler Moore Show)
Alec Guinness (as Obi-Wan Kenobi)
Harrison Ford (as himself and as Indiana Jones)
Ian McKellen
Mel Gibson
Peter O'Toole
Rip Torn
Russell Crowe
Tom Brokaw
Ozzy Osbourne
Vince Vaughn

Discography
Hovercraft (2007)

References

External links
Official website

1977 births
Living people
American impressionists (entertainers)
American male comedians
American male film actors
American male television actors
American male video game actors
American male voice actors
American male writers
Comedians from Missouri
Male actors from St. Louis
Rice University alumni
21st-century American comedians